The Boeing United Airlines Terminal, Hangar and Fountain in Cheyenne, Wyoming were built for Boeing Air Transport between 1929 and 1934. The Louis Sullivan-influenced designs form a consistent theme in a time when Cheyenne Municipal Airport was a major air transport facility. The 1930 hangar was designed by Cheyenne architect Frederic Porter, Sr. The 1934 Art Deco fountain was designed as a memorial to early aviation history.

The hangar was designed by Fredric Porter, Sr.

References

External links
Boeing United Airlines Terminal Building, Hangar and Fountain at the Wyoming State Historic Preservation Office
Historic American Engineering Record documentation, filed under 200 East Eighth Avenue, Cheyenne, Laramie County, WY:

Transportation buildings and structures on the National Register of Historic Places in Wyoming
Buildings and structures in Cheyenne, Wyoming
Art Deco architecture in Wyoming
Air transportation buildings and structures on the National Register of Historic Places
Historic American Engineering Record in Wyoming
National Register of Historic Places in Cheyenne, Wyoming
Aircraft hangars on the National Register of Historic Places
1929 establishments in Wyoming